Ihor Ivanovych  Zaytsev (21 April 1934 – 27 January 2016) was a football striker.

Career
Born in Moscow, Zaytsev spent his career as player for a number of different Soviet football clubs, including Lokomotiv Moscow, Dynamo Kyiv, Shakhtar Donetsk and Avanhard Ternopil. After his retirement from football at age 30, Zaytsev worked as a hairdresser. In 2015, he lived in Kyiv. He died in 2016, aged 81.

Awards and honours
Awards
 USSR Premier League runner-up: 1959
 USSR Cup: 1957

References

External links
 Profile at ua-football.com 

1934 births
2016 deaths
Footballers from Moscow
Soviet footballers
Olympic footballers of the Soviet Union
Ukrainian footballers
SKA Lviv players
FC Lokomotiv Moscow players
FC Shakhtar Donetsk players
FC Dynamo Kyiv players
FC Nyva Ternopil players
FC Spartak Ivano-Frankivsk players
Soviet Top League players
Association football forwards
PFC CSKA Moscow players